Olivier Guyotjeannin (born 13 March 1959, Suresnes) is a French medievalist and diplomatist.

Career 
Olivier Guyotjeannin graduated as archivist-paleographer from the École Nationale des Chartes in 1981 with a thesis entitled La seigneurie des évêques de Beauvais et de Noyon (Xe-début du XIIIe) which earned him first place of his class. He was a member of the École française de Rome (1983–1986).

First a curator of archives in Saint-Pierre-et-Miquelon, he was later appointed at the Archives nationales in Paris.

In 1989, succeeding Robert-Henri Bautier, he was elected at the chair of institutions, archives and diplomatics of Middle Ages at the École des Chartes where he also taught medieval Latin.

Works 
1986: Saint-Pierre-et-Miquelon, Paris, L’Harmattan
1987: Episcopus et comes : affirmation et déclin de la seigneurie épiscopale au nord du royaume de France : Beauvais-Noyon, Xe-début XIIIe, Geneva: , (Mémoire et documents de l’École des chartes)
1992: Archives de l'Occident. Tome 1er, Le Moyen âge (éd.), Paris, Fayard
1993: Les Cartulaires : actes de la Table ronde organisée par l'École nationale des chartes et le GDR 121 du CNRS, Paris, 5-7 December 1991, Geneva : Droz (Mémoire et documents de l’École des chartes) (coll.)
1994: Diplomatique médiévale, with vec Pycke et Tock, Turnhout, Brepols
1995: Salimbene de Adam : un chroniqueur franciscain, Turnhout : Brepols
1996: Autour de Gerbert d'Aurillac, le pape de l'an mil : album de documents commentés, Paris, École des chartes (with Emmanuel Poulle)
1996: Clovis chez les historiens, Geneva, Librairie Droz (dir.)
1998: Les Sources de l'histoire médiévale, Paris, Le Livre de Poche
2000: Le Chartrier de l'abbaye prémontrée de Saint-Yved de Braine (1134-1250), Paris : École des chartes (éd. ; dir.)
2001: Conseils pour l'édition des textes médiévaux, fasc. 1-2, Paris : CTHS (coord.)
2002: Terriers et plans-terriers du XIIIe au XVIIIe, actes du colloque de Paris, 23-25 septembre 1998, Paris, Rennes, Geneva (codir.)
2002: Histoire de la France politique, Tome 1 : Le Moyen Age : Le roi, l'Église, les grands, le peuple 481-1514, with Philippe Contamine and Régine Le Jan, Paris, Éditions du Seuil
2003: La Langue des actes : actes du XIe Congrès international de diplomatique (Troyes, Thursday 11-Saturday 13 September 2003), Read online
2005: Atlas de l'histoire de France, La France médiévale, IXe-XVe siècle, Autrement, Paris (coll.)  102 p.
2005: Le Formulaire d'Odart Morchesne, Paris, École des chartes (éd. ; en coll.)

External links 
 Olivier Mattéoni and Olivier Guyotjeannin, séminaire de méthodologie
 Les sources de l'histoire médiévale on Histoire pour tous
 Portrait Olivier Guyotjeannin, Diplomatique : définition et évolutions on Daily motion 
 Notice on CTHS
 Olivier Guyotjeannin on the site of the École Nationale des Chartes
 On overinterpretation of medieval deeds. Some French examples around the year one thousand by Olivier Guyotjeannin

École Nationale des Chartes alumni
Academic staff of the École Nationale des Chartes
20th-century French historians
21st-century French historians
French medievalists
People from Suresnes
1959 births
Living people